Jessica C. Flack is a data scientist, evolutionary biologist, and professor at the Santa Fe Institute.

Education and career
Jessica Flack attended Cornell University for her undergraduate studies and graduated in 1996 with a Bachelor of the Arts (Honors Degree). She received her PhD from Emory University in 2003, where she studied cognitive science, animal behavior and evolutionary theory. Following her Ph.D. she moved to the Santa Fe Institute as a postdoctoral fellow, and studied complexity science, collective behavior, and robustness from 2004 to 2007.

In 2011 she moved to the  University of Wisconsin, Madison to help found and direct the Center of Complexity & Collective Computation in the Wisconsin Institute for Discovery. Following her work in Wisconsin, she went back to the Santa Fe Institute and, as of 2022, works there as a professor. Flack also acts as the director for the Collective Computation Group at SFI, and serves as the Chair of Public Events. She performs much of her research in collaboration with co-director David Krakauer.

Research 
Flack is known for her work connecting the behavior of individuals to group activity. She has used animals, particularly macaques monkeys, to examine group behavior. Flack's early work examined social rules within chimpanzees. Her work with macaque revealed that fights within a group improve group's ability to make decisions, a process Flack calls collective computation. She has also used macaque to examine conflict resolution and social structure.

Selected publications

References 

Living people
Cornell University alumni
Emory University alumni
University of Wisconsin–Madison faculty
Santa Fe Institute people
Data scientists
Primatologists
Year of birth missing (living people)